The Straits Exchange Foundation (SEF; ; often abbreviated as 海基會) is a semiofficial organization set up by the Government of the Republic of China (Taiwan) to handle technical and/or business matters with the People's Republic of China (PRC). Though technically a private organization, it is funded by the government and under the supervision of the Mainland Affairs Council of the Executive Yuan.  Its role is effectively to function as the de facto embassy to the PRC, as a means of avoiding acknowledgement of the PRC's statehood status.

Its counterpart in the PRC is the Association for Relations Across the Taiwan Straits (ARATS).

History

Due to the complexity of the political and legal status of cross-strait relations and lack of contact between the two sides, the ROC government had to create an intermediary body from the private sector to deal with all cross-strait matters. Thus on 9 March 1991, the SEF was formally established with the help of the government and private sector funds.

At the same time, the PRC government established ARATS. The creation of these two offices facilitate a new stage in cross-strait relations after they had been virtually non-existent for almost 50 years after the end of the Chinese civil war in 1949.

Organization structure

 Department of Cultural Affairs
 Department of Economic Affairs
 Department of Legal Affairs
 Department of Planning and Public Affairs
 Secretariat
 Personnel Office
 Accounting Office

List of chairpersons

SEF branch office in Mainland China
On 11 April 2013, the Executive Yuan approved a bill to open SEF branch offices in Mainland China. That month, ROC President Ma Ying-jeou said the SEF offices in Mainland China will not fly ROC flags, either inside or outside the office buildings, because Taiwan and Mainland China are not officially foreign nations in relation to each other. In the initial announcement, three offices were planned.

SEF building
The current SEF building in Beian Road originated since its groundbreaking construction on 25 September 2010 when its ceremony was presided over by then SEF Chairman Chiang Pin-kung. On 31 March 2012, the finished constructed building was refurbished and SEF started to move there on 4 April 2012 from their old rented office building on Minsheng East Road. The new building was opened for service on 9 April 2012. On 18 May 2012, President Ma Ying-jeou presided over the building's official opening ceremony.

Transportation
The SEF building is adjacent to Dazhi Station of the Taipei Metro on the Brown Line.

See also
 1992 Consensus

Notes

References

External links

 

Executive Yuan
Cross-Strait relations
1991 establishments in Taiwan
Organizations established in 1991
Organizations based in Taipei